The Secret of the Loch is a 1934 British film about the Loch Ness Monster. It is the first film made about the monster.

Charles Bennett said the film was based on his original idea. He later admitted it was "terrible... but amusing".

Plot
Professor Heggie is determined to prove to a sceptical scientific community the existence of a dinosaur in Loch Ness. Young London reporter Jimmy Anderson believes him and offers to help. He also falls in love with Angela, the professor's granddaughter. Jimmy finally plucks up the courage to enter the Loch himself, and comes face to face with the monster.

Cast

Production
Charles Bennett and Billie Bristow visited Loch Ness in December 1933 to research the film.

The film was known as Sinister Deeps.

The film was shot over four weeks.

Critical reception
TV Guide called the film "a trite programmer which doesn't make one believe in the humans' actions, much less the sea serpent's"; while Allmovie called it a "fairly amusing British monster movie...obscure but entertaining oddity"; and Britmovie noted an "enjoyable comic romp."

References

External links

1934 films
Films set in Scotland
Ealing Studios films
Films directed by Milton Rosmer
British monster movies
Films about dinosaurs
Films set in London
British black-and-white films
British fantasy adventure films
1930s fantasy adventure films
1930s English-language films
1930s British films